Neochen is a genus of birds in the family Anatidae.

Extant species 
The genus contains a single living species:

Fossil species 
 †Neochen barbadiana
 †Neochen debilis
 †Neochen pugil

References

 
Geese
Bird genera
Bird genera with one living species
Birds of South America
Birds described in 1918
Taxa named by Harry C. Oberholser